Nils Conrad Kindberg (7 August 1832 in Karlstad – 23 August 1910 in Uppsala) was a Swedish bryologist.

From 1849 he studied at Uppsala University, earning his PhD in 1857. In 1859 he worked as a teacher in Vänersborg, then from 1860 to 1901 taught classes in natural sciences and mathematics in Linköping.

The moss genus Kindbergia (family Brachytheciaceae) is named in his honor.

Selected works 
 Monographia generis Lepigonorum (1863).
 Svensk flora. Beskrifning öfver Sveriges fanerogamer och ormbunkar (1877).
 "New Canadian mosses" (1889); with John Macoun. 
 "Catalogue of Canadian plants. Part VI, musci"; with John Macoun (1892).
 "European and N. American Bryineæ (Mosses)"; 2 parts, published in English (1896).
 "Genera of European and Northamerican Bryineæ (Mosses) synoptically disposed" (1897).
 Laubmoose aus dem Umanakdistrikt (1897).
 Skandinavisk bladmossflora (1903). 
 "New combinations and new taxa of mosses proposed by Nils Conrad Kindberg"; by William C. Steere and Howard A. Crum (1977).

References

External links 
 

19th-century Swedish botanists
20th-century Swedish botanists
1832 births
1910 deaths
Bryologists
People from Karlstad
Uppsala University alumni